Russia is divided into twelve economic regions (ekonomicheskiye rayony, sing. ekonomichesky rayon)—groups of federal subjects sharing the following characteristics:

Common economic and social goals and participation in development programs;
Relatively similar economic conditions and potential;
Similar climatic, ecological, and geological conditions;
Similar methods of technical inspection of new construction;
Similar methods of conducting customs oversight;
Overall similar living conditions of the population.

No federal subject can belong to more than one economic region.

Economic regions are also grouped into economic zones (also called "macrozones"). An economic region or its parts can belong to more than one economic zone.

Establishment and abolition of economic regions and economic zones or any changes in their composition are decided upon by the federal government of Russia.

This division into economic regions is different from the division into federal districts. The former are solely for economic and statistical purposes, and the latter exist solely to uphold the federal laws on the territory of the country.

Table

List and composition of the economic regions
The following is the list and composition of the economic regions, sorted by population.

 Central Black Earth (Tsentralno-Chernozyomny)
Belgorod Oblast
Kursk Oblast
Lipetsk Oblast
Tambov Oblast
Voronezh Oblast

 Central (Tsentralny)
Bryansk Oblast
Ivanovo Oblast
Kaluga Oblast
Kostroma Oblast
Moscow (federal city)
Moscow Oblast
Oryol Oblast
Ryazan Oblast
Smolensk Oblast
Tula Oblast
Tver Oblast
Vladimir Oblast
Yaroslavl Oblast

 East Siberian (Vostochno-Sibirsky)
Irkutsk Oblast
Khakassia
Krasnoyarsk Krai
Tuva Republic

 Far Eastern  (Dalnevostochny)
Amur Oblast
Buryat Republic
Chukotka Autonomous Okrug
Jewish Autonomous Oblast
Kamchatka Krai
Khabarovsk Krai
Magadan Oblast
Primorsky Krai
Sakha
Sakhalin Oblast
Zabaykalsky Krai

 Kaliningrad (Kaliningradsky)
Kaliningrad Oblast

 North Caucasus (Severo-Kavkazsky)
Adygea
Chechen Republic
Crimea
Dagestan
Ingushetia
Kabardino-Balkar Republic
Karachay–Cherkess Republic
Krasnodar Krai
North Ossetia–Alania
Rostov Oblast
Sevastopol (federal city)
Stavropol Krai

 Northern (Severny)
Arkhangelsk Oblast
Karelia
Komi Republic
Murmansk Oblast
Nenets Autonomous Okrug
Vologda Oblast

 Northwestern (Severo-Zapadny)
Leningrad Oblast
Novgorod Oblast
Pskov Oblast
Saint Petersburg (federal city)

 Ural (Uralsky)
Bashkortostan
Chelyabinsk Oblast
Kurgan Oblast
Orenburg Oblast
Perm Krai
Sverdlovsk Oblast
Udmurt Republic

 Volga (Povolzhsky), the traditional name of the region, meaning "the area by the Volga River"
Astrakhan Oblast
Kalmykia
Penza Oblast
Samara Oblast
Saratov Oblast
Tatarstan
Ulyanovsk Oblast
Volgograd Oblast

 Volga-Vyatka (Volgo-Vyatsky)
Chuvash Republic
Kirov Oblast
Mari El Republic
Mordovia
Nizhny Novgorod Oblast

 West Siberian (Zapadno-Sibirsky)
Altai Krai
Altai Republic
Kemerovo Oblast
Khanty–Mansi Autonomous Okrug
Novosibirsk Oblast
Omsk Oblast
Tomsk Oblast
Tyumen Oblast
Yamalo-Nenets Autonomous Okrug

See also
 List of economic zones and macrozones of Russia

References

 
Lists of subdivisions of Russia